Sir Colin Philip Joseph Woods  (20 April 1920 – 27 January 2001) was an English police officer in the London Metropolitan Police who was also the first Commissioner of the Australian Federal Police, from 1979 to 1982.

Born in London, Woods was the son of a Metropolitan Police Sub-Divisional Inspector and was educated at Finchley Grammar School. He served in the King's Royal Rifle Corps and the Royal Ulster Rifles (into which he was commissioned in February 1944) throughout the Second World War, from 1939 to 1946, and then joined the Metropolitan Police as a Constable, rising through the ranks to Deputy Commander.

In 1966, he was promoted Commander (Traffic) and in 1968 Deputy Assistant Commissioner (Management Services). The following year he was appointed Commandant of Bramshill Police College, and in 1970 returned to the Met as Assistant Commissioner "B" (Traffic). On 31 March 1972 he was moved to be Assistant Commissioner "C" (Crime). This caused a certain amount of controversy, since he had never previously served in the Criminal Investigation Department (CID), which he was now taking over. Robert Mark, the new Commissioner, had already stated that he believed uniformed and CID officers should be interchangeable in senior posts, and Woods's appointment was the first example of this policy. He was appointed Commander of the Order of the British Empire (CBE) in the 1973 Birthday Honours. In 1975, Mark appointed Woods Deputy Commissioner. He was appointed Knight Commander of the Royal Victorian Order (KCVO) in the 1977 Birthday Honours.

On 1 August 1977, Woods was appointed HM Chief Inspector of Constabulary. He held this post for two years until he was asked to establish the new Australian Federal Police in 1979. He was awarded the Queen's Police Medal (QPM) in the 1980 New Year Honours.

Footnotes

References
Biography, Who Was Who

1920 births
2001 deaths
People from Finchley
King's Royal Rifle Corps soldiers
Royal Ulster Rifles officers
British Army personnel of World War II
Assistant Commissioners of Police of the Metropolis
Deputy Commissioners of Police of the Metropolis
Knights Commander of the Royal Victorian Order
Commanders of the Order of the British Empire
Australian recipients of the Queen's Police Medal
English recipients of the Queen's Police Medal
Commissioners of the Australian Federal Police
Chief Inspectors of Constabulary (England and Wales)
People educated at Finchley Grammar School